Stenoptilodes duckworthi is a moth of the family Pterophoridae that is known from Argentina.

Adults are on wing in February.

External links

duckworthi
Moths described in 1991
Endemic fauna of Argentina
Moths of South America